Frederick Grimke (September 1, 1791 – March 8, 1863) was a judge and author in the U.S. State of Ohio who served on the Ohio Supreme Court from 1836–1842.

Biography
Frederick Grimke was born in Charleston, South Carolina, a son of John Faucheraud Grimké, a Revolutionary War hero and jurist in that state, and a major slaveholder.  Frederick would later drop the accent from this last name.  His siblings included the Grimké sisters, whose antislavery views he did not share, the attorney Thomas Smith Grimké, and Henry W. Grimké, father of the African-American leaders Archibald Grimké and Francis J. Grimké.  Frederick graduated from Yale University at age 19, studied law in South Carolina, and practiced in that state before moving to Chillicothe, Ohio in 1818.

From 1820 to 1836, Grimke was President Judge of the Court of Common Pleas. In 1836, he was elected a Judge on the Ohio Supreme Court. Throughout this time he wrote essays for the Scioto Gazette (Chillicothe) and Ohio State Journal (Columbus). In 1842, literary and philosophical studies became an obsession, and he resigned from the Supreme Court.

In 1846, the 544 page Considerations upon the Nature and Tendency of Free Institutions was published. The historian Richard Hofstadter has described it as deserving "a place among the more important books of nineteenth-century political speculation," for its analysis of two-party political conflict. Before he died during the American Civil War, he directed that one copy be delivered to the Federal Government, and one to the Confederate Government. He also published Essay on Ancient and Modern Literature, where he came out firmly in favor of the modern over the Classics.

Grimke died March 8, 1863 at his bachelor quarters at the Madeira House in Chillicothe, and it was said that when he was moved from there to the grave, not one woman followed his remains to his resting place. He was interred at Grandview Cemetery (Chillicothe, Ohio).

Honors 
 Elected a member of the American Antiquarian Society in 1836.

Publications

Notes

References

 

Ohio lawyers
Justices of the Ohio Supreme Court
People from Chillicothe, Ohio
Politicians from Charleston, South Carolina
1791 births
1863 deaths
Yale University alumni
Burials at Grandview Cemetery (Chillicothe, Ohio)
Members of the American Antiquarian Society
Lawyers from Charleston, South Carolina
19th-century American judges
19th-century American lawyers